Lori Kirkland Baker (née Kirkland) is an American writer and producer.

Career
Kirkland first worked as a writer's assistant on Perfect Strangers.

Kirkland was a writer for three episodes of Jenny in 1997. She was a writer and co-executive producer for two seasons of Wings from 1994–1996, seven seasons of Frasier from 1998–2004, one season of Freddie (2005–2006), and two seasons of Desperate Housewives. She testified in Nicollette Sheridan's wrongful termination trial.

Awards
Kirkland won a Primetime Emmy Award and a Writers Guild Award for Frasier.

References

External links
 

American television writers
American television producers
American women television producers
Living people
American women television writers
Writers Guild of America Award winners
Place of birth missing (living people)
Year of birth missing (living people)
21st-century American women